Darren Collier (born 1 December 1967) is an English former professional footballer who played as a goalkeeper in the Football League for Blackburn Rovers and Darlington, in the Hong Kong First Division League for Sing Tao, and in the Scottish League for Berwick Rangers. He was born in Stockton-on-Tees, and began his professional football career on a non-contract basis with Middlesbrough.

References

1967 births
Living people
Footballers from Stockton-on-Tees
Footballers from County Durham
English footballers
Association football goalkeepers
Middlesbrough F.C. players
Blackburn Rovers F.C. players
Darlington F.C. players
Sing Tao SC players
Berwick Rangers F.C. players
Billingham Town F.C. players
English Football League players
Hong Kong First Division League players
Expatriate footballers in Hong Kong
English expatriate sportspeople in Hong Kong
English expatriate footballers